The 2022 Elanthoor human sacrifice case refers to a crime in which two women were tortured and murdered as part of two human sacrifice rituals in Elanthoor village in Pathanamthitta district of Kerala. Ongoing investigations by the Kerala Police saw the arrests of Muhammed Shafi, Bhagawal Singh and his wife Laila. The victims were Roslyn and Padma, both lottery ticket vendors, who were living away from their families. The case received media attention because the killings were done for human sacrifice and reportedly involved cannibalism.

Investigation
The relatives of one of the victims, Padma, native of Kadavantra, Kochi, had lodged a complaint with the police in September when she went missing. While investigating this case, the police discovered the possibility of human sacrifice. While investigating the disappearance of Padma, the police received information that another woman, Roslyn, a native of Kaladi, had also gone missing in a similar manner.

References

Murder in India
October 2022 events in India
2022 murders in India